Sergei Zholtok, who was also known as Sergejs Žoltoks (December 2, 1972 – November 3, 2004) was a Latvian professional ice hockey centre who played ten seasons in the National Hockey League (NHL) for the Boston Bruins, Ottawa Senators, Montreal Canadiens, Edmonton Oilers, Minnesota Wild and Nashville Predators.

Playing career
Žoltoks was drafted 55th overall by the Boston Bruins in the 1992 NHL Entry Draft. Prior to being drafted, he won a gold medal with USSR national team in IIHF Junior World Championships in 1992. After playing 25 games with the Boston Bruins in the 1992–93 NHL season and the 1993–94 NHL season, Žoltoks spent the next years playing in minor leagues.

Žoltoks returned to the NHL in the 1996–97 NHL season with the Ottawa Senators. In the following years, he played for the Montreal Canadiens, Edmonton Oilers, Minnesota Wild and the Nashville Predators.

During the 2004–05 NHL lockout, Žoltoks returned to Latvia and played for Riga 2000 team of the Latvian Hockey Higher League and the Belarusian Extraleague.

Death 
On November 3, 2004, his cardiac arrhythmia resurfaced during the game between Riga 2000 and Dinamo Minsk. Žoltoks left the game with five minutes remaining, collapsing and dying after returning to the dressing room in the arms of teammate Darby Hendrickson. An autopsy determined heart failure as the cause of death. He was survived by his wife, Anna, and two sons. This was not the first occurrence; in January 2003, he had to leave the game due to arrhythmia, and had been observed in a hospital overnight. He was allowed to return to playing after missing seven games.

During his ten seasons in the NHL, he played in 588 regular season games, scored 111 goals and had 147 assists.

Awards and achievements
 1994: AHL Player of the Week (Dec. 11)
 1996: Ironman Award, International Hockey League, given to a player who has played in every game for his team and displayed outstanding offensive and defensive skills.
 2005: Riga Secondary School No. 55 was named in honour of Sergejs Žoltoks.

Career statistics

Regular season and playoffs

International

See also
List of ice hockey players who died during their playing career

References

External links
Official Sergei Zholtok Memorial Site

1972 births
2004 deaths
Boston Bruins draft picks
Boston Bruins players
Dinamo Riga players
Edmonton Oilers players
Ice hockey players who died while playing
Latvian ice hockey centres
Minnesota Wild players
Montreal Canadiens players
Nashville Predators players
Ottawa Senators players
Providence Bruins players
Quebec Citadelles players
Sport deaths in Belarus
Ice hockey people from Riga
Soviet ice hockey centres
Latvian expatriate ice hockey people
Latvian expatriate sportspeople in Canada
Latvian expatriate sportspeople in the United States
Expatriate ice hockey players in the United States
Expatriate ice hockey players in Canada